Pewabic Pottery is a ceramic studio and school in Detroit, Michigan. Founded in 1903, the studio is known for its iridescent glazes, some of which grace notable buildings such as the Shedd Aquarium and Basilica of the National Shrine of the Immaculate Conception. The pottery continues in operation today, and was designated a National Historic Landmark in 1991.

Origin and history
The pottery was founded in 1903 by the artist and teacher Mary Chase Perry Stratton and Horace James Caulkins, her business partner. Caulkins was considered a high-heat and kiln specialist, and developed the "Revelation kiln". Mary Perry Stratton was "the artistic and marketing force." The collaboration of two and their blend of art and technology gave the pottery its distinctive qualities as Detroit's contribution to the International Arts and Crafts movement and exemplified the American Craftsman Style.

The word Pewabic is derived from the Ojibwa (or Chippewa) word "wabic", which means metal, or "bewabic", which means iron or steel, and specifically referring to the "Pewabic" Upper Peninsula copper mine where Ms. Stratton walked with her father. The company is well known for the unusual iridescent glaze covering the pottery and tiles created in a manner outlined by the International Arts and Crafts movement.

In 1991, Pewabic Pottery was designated as a National Historic Landmark (see also List of National Historic Landmarks in Michigan). As Michigan's only historic pottery, the center continues to operate in a 1907 Tudor Revival building as a non-profit educational institution. They offer classes in ceramics, hold exhibitions, sell pottery made in house, showcase and sell artists from across the United States, and offer design and fabrication services for public and private buildings.

Museum and galleries
The museum's exhibits focus on the company's role in the history of Detroit, the Arts and Crafts movement in America and the development of ceramic art in the country. The galleries also showcase new works by modern ceramic artists.

Famous works
Pewabic Pottery produces many kinds of hand made decorative objects. They are part of the collections of the Detroit Institute of Arts, the University of Michigan Museum of Art, and the Freer Gallery of Art. 

Under Mary Stratton's artistic leadership, Pewabic Pottery employees created lamps, vessels, and architectural tiles. Architectural pieces have been a staple in Pewabic's history. They were known for their iridescent (like an oil slick with an incredible translucent quality and a phantasmagoric depth of color) glazes. Architectural tiles were used in churches, concert halls, fountains, libraries, museums, schools and public buildings. The studio's work graces numerous edifices throughout Michigan and the rest of the United States. Noteworthy examples include Herzstein Hall at Rice University in Houston, Texas, and the Shedd Aquarium in Chicago. Illinois. Detailed maps of public installations in the Detroit Metropolitan Area and the U.S.A. are available. See Architectural tile infra.

Particularly notable was the company's work at the Basilica of the National Shrine of the Immaculate Conception in Washington, D.C., consisting of arches outlined with iridescent Pewabic tile, huge ceramic medallions set in the ceiling, and fourteen Stations of the Cross for the crypt.

Pewabic's design team continues to create ornate tile conceptions for public and private buildings. Contemporary installations include Comerica Park, home of the Detroit Tigers, Detroit Medical Center Children's Hospital, five Detroit People Mover stations, Third Man Records (Detroit), stations for the Q-Line, and the Herald Square in New York City.

Architectural tile

Pewabic tile was (and continues to be) in great demand in Detroit and the southeastern Michigan area for the use in buildings and it can be found in many of the area's finest structures. These include:
 Belle Isle Aquarium, Belle Isle Park Detroit, Michigan
 Cathedral Church of St. Paul, Detroit, Michigan
 Cathedral of the Most Blessed Sacrament, Detroit, Michigan
 Charles Lang Freer House, 71 East Ferry Avenue (Current name: Palmer, Merrill, Institute of Human Development & Family Life) Detroit, Michigan
 Christ Church, Cranbrook, Bloomfield Hills, Michigan
 Compuware World Headquarters, Detroit, Michigan
 Cowles House (a/k/a Alice B. Cowles house, formerly known as Faculty Row House Number 7 and presently the Michigan State University President's home), East Lansing, Michigan
 Cranbrook Kingswood School, many facilities
 Detroit Institute of Arts, Detroit, Michigan (loggia)
 Detroit People Mover many stations, Detroit, Michigan
 Detroit Public Library Children's Room, Detroit, Michigan
 Detroit Zoological Park, Royal Oak, Michigan
 Edward H. McNamara Terminal, Northwest Airlines, Detroit Metropolitan Wayne County Airport, Romulus, Michigan
 English Inn (formerly Medovue Manor), Eaton Rapids, Michigan built in 1927 for Oldsmobile President Irving Jacob Reuter
 Father Solanus Casey Center, Detroit, Michigan
 Guardian Building, Detroit, Michigan.
 Harper House, 1408 Cambridge Drive, Lansing, Michigan
 Hill Auditorium, University of Michigan, Ann Arbor, Michigan
 Kedzie North, Michigan State University, East Lansing, Michigan
 Kirk in the Hills, Bloomfield Hills, Michigan
 Lawrence Fisher Mansion, Detroit, Michigan
 Mackenzie High School, 9275 Wyoming Avenue, Detroit, Michigan  (Now at the landfill - demolished)
 Maude Priest School, Detroit, Michigan
 Michigan Historical Museum, Lansing, Michigan
 Michigan League, University of Michigan, Ann Arbor, Michigan
 Michigan Union, University of Michigan, Ann Arbor, Michigan
 Michigan State University Memorial Chapel, East Lansing, Michigan
 Michigan State University Union Women's Lounge (fireplace), East Lansing, Michigan

 Morton High School, Richmond, Indiana
 National Theater, Monroe and Farmer, Detroit, Michigan (facade, 1911)
 North Kedzie Hall, Michigan State University, East Lansing, Michigan
 Oakland Family Services, Pontiac, Michigan
 Sacred Heart Major Seminary, Detroit, Michigan
 Scott Fountain, Belle Isle Park, Detroit, Michigan, 1922
 Shaw Hall, Michigan State University, East Lansing, Michigan
 Southfield Public Library, Southfield, Michigan
 Stephen M. Ross School of Business, University of Michigan, Ann Arbor, Michigan
 Wayne State University David Adamany Undergraduate Library, 5155 Gullen Mall Detroit, MI 48202-3962
 Wayne State University Merrill Palmer Institute, Detroit, Michigan
 Wayne State University, Old Main, Previously, Detroit Central High School, 4841 Cass Detroit, MI 48201
 Women's City Club now Detroit Police Academy, Elizabeth and Park, Detroit, Michigan

See also

 Arts and Crafts movement
 Detroit Yacht Club
 List of National Historic Landmarks in Michigan
 Niloak Pottery
 Pottery
 Rookwood Pottery Company
 Studio pottery
 Tile
 Van Briggle Pottery
 William B. and Mary Chase Stratton House

References
Notes

Sources

 Barrie, Dennis; Jeanie Huntley Bentley; Cynthia Newman Helms; Mary Chris Rospond, Artists in Michigan: 1900-1976. (Wayne State University Press, Detroit 1989). .
 Brunk, Thomas W. "Ceramics in Michigan, 1886-1906" in The Arts and Crafts Movement in Michigan: 1886-1906. (Detroit, The Pewabic Society, Inc., 1986). 
 Brunk, Colby, Jacobs et al., Arts and Crafts in Detroit 1906-1976: The Movement, The Society, The School. (Detroit Institute of Arts, Detroit MI 1976).
 Brunk, Thomas W., with Introduction by Marilyn L. Wheaton, Marshall Fredericks Sculpture Museum Exhibition Catalog, June 1 through September 29, 2007, Essay on Pewabic Pottery.
 Colby, Joy Hakanson, Art and a City: A History of the Detroit Society of Arts and Crafts. (Wayne State University Press, Detroit MI, 1956). .
 Fisher, Marcy Heller and illustrated by Marjorie Hecht Simon, Fired Magic: Detroit's Pewabic Pottery Treasure. (Wayne State University Press, 2003). .
 Gibson, Arthur Hopkin, Artists of Early Michigan: A Biographical Dictionary of Artists Native to or Active in Michigan, 1701-1900. Wayne State University Press, Detroit, 1975. .
 Hill, Eric J., and John Gallagher, AIA Detroit: The American Institute of Architects Guide to Architecture in Detroit. (Wayne State University Press, Detroit, MI 2003). .
 Karlson, Norman, The Encyclopedia of American Art Tiles, Volume 2, Region 3: Midwestern States. (Schiffer Publishing Ltd., 2005).  .
 Pear, Lillian Myers, The Pewabic Pottery: A History of its Products and its People. (Des Moines, Iowa, Wallace-Homestead: 1976). .
 Rago, David, Suzanne Sliker, and David Rudd, The Arts & Crafts Collector's Guide. (Salt Lake City, Utah, Gibbs Smith, 2005). .
 Savage, Rebecca Binno and Greg Kowalski. Art Deco in Detroit (Images of America). (Arcadia, 2004). .

External links
 Pewabic Pottery - official site
 Child's history of Pewabic Pottery and Mary Stratton--Michigan Historical Museum
Pewabic page at Craft in America
 Marshall Fredericks Sculpture Museum Exhibition Catalog, June 1 through September 29, 2007, Essay on Pewabic Pottery, its importance, and the partnership between Caulkins and Stratton (Archive August, 2007)
 Pewabic Pottery Virtual Tour

Culture of Detroit
Education in Detroit
1903 establishments in Michigan
Arts and Crafts movement
Art schools in Michigan
National Historic Landmarks in Metro Detroit
American pottery
Art museums and galleries in Michigan
Museums in Detroit
National Register of Historic Places in Detroit
Ceramics museums in the United States